Gabaran castle is a historical castle located in Savojbolagh County in Alborz Province, The longevity of this fortress dates back to the Historical periods after Islam.

References 

Castles in Iran
Castles of the Nizari Ismaili state